Toby Penty (born 12 August 1992) is a retired English badminton player. He started playing badminton at aged 9, and won U-19 English National Championships in 2011. In 2010, he won junior titles in the Netherlands and Switzerland. In 2017, he won the Swedish International tournament in the men's singles event.

Penty competed at the 2019 European Games, 2020 Olympic Games and at the 2022 Commonwealth Games.

Penty announced his retirement on 6 September 2022. The 2022 BWF World Championships was his last tournament.

Personal life 
Penty has lost all of his hair on his body since November 2018, and it was diagnosed as alopecia.

Achievements

BWF Grand Prix (1 title) 
The BWF Grand Prix had two levels, the Grand Prix and Grand Prix Gold. It was a series of badminton tournaments sanctioned by the Badminton World Federation (BWF) and played between 2007 and 2017.

Men's singles

  BWF Grand Prix Gold tournament
  BWF Grand Prix tournament

BWF International Challenge/Series (4 titles, 7 runners-up) 
Men's singles

  BWF International Challenge tournament
  BWF International Series tournament
  BWF Future Series tournament

References

External links 
 

1992 births
Living people
People from Walton-on-Thames
English male badminton players
Badminton players at the 2020 Summer Olympics
Olympic badminton players of Great Britain
Badminton players at the 2019 European Games
European Games competitors for Great Britain
Badminton players at the 2022 Commonwealth Games
Commonwealth Games competitors for England
People with alopecia universalis